William "Bill" Sikes is a fictional character and the main antagonist in the 1838 novel Oliver Twist by Charles Dickens. Sikes is a malicious criminal in Fagin's gang, and a vicious robber and murderer. Throughout much of the novel Sikes is shadowed by his “bull-terrier” dog Bull's-eye.

Role in the novel
Dickens describes his first appearance:

His girlfriend Nancy reluctantly tolerates, but is intimidated by, his violent behaviour. However, when he thinks Nancy has betrayed him, Sikes viciously murders her. After police identify him as travelling with a dog, Sikes attempts to drown Bull's-eye to rid himself of his companion. In the end he hangs himself while trying to escape. It is left ambiguous whether or not this act was accidental or intentional.

Sikes is a somewhat conflicted character. For instance, after preventing Nancy from keeping her midnight appointment with Rose Maylie and Mr Brownlow, he wondered aloud to Fagin if being indoors for so long in their dingy lodging was beginning to affect her after she dedicated the whole day caring for him. After he brutally beats Nancy to death, Sikes apparently is capable of feeling guilt—although the reader cannot be sure the emotion is not merely his suspicion that Fagin lied to him about her betrayal and fear of being arrested for the crime.

Sikes lives in Bethnal Green and later moves to the squalid rookery area of London then called Jacob's Island, east of present-day Shad Thames. Otherwise, Sikes's background and early life prior to joining Fagin are not mentioned in the book.

Theatrical, cinematic and TV portrayals

In the theatre, Sikes was played by Richard John Smith in Oliver Twist; or, The Parish Boy's Progress (1839), and by Henry Irving opposite Ellen Terry as Nancy in Oliver Twist at the Queen's Theatre in London (1868).

Robert Newton first played Sikes on screen in the 1948 British film noir Oliver Twist. Sikes's death is changed slightly: while attempting to swing to another building to escape the mob, he is shot by a police officer and dies while dangling from a building by a rope around his body. Perhaps Newton's portrayal is the closest to how Dickens himself envisioned the character: a vicious, heavy drinking sociopath.

Peter Vaughan portrayed Sikes in the BBC's 1962 television adaptation, which saw the character portrayed in a gritty, violent way considered to be faithful to the original book. The scene where he brutally murders Nancy was very controversial at the time, with questions being asked in parliament if the serial should've even been allowed to air.

Sikes was played by Danny Sewell in the stage musical Oliver! which won several awards in the early 1960s. Oliver Reed played Sikes in the musical's 1968 film adaptation which also won several awards, including the Oscar for Best Picture, with Reed's performance often cited as one of the best portrayals of Sikes – being labelled as "the sinister core of the film". His songs are removed from the film, making his performance of the character closer to that of the novel rather than the stage version. The famous climax of the 1948 film adaptation is retained and Bill Sikes dies in the same manner of being shot then hanging himself.

In Disney's animated version, Oliver & Company (1988), Sikes is renamed Sykes and he is a cold-hearted loan shark who lives and works in a New York shipyard with his pet Dobermans, Roscoe and DeSoto, and is voiced by Robert Loggia, who was cast in the role after Marlon Brando rejected an offer to voice the character because he felt the film was going to be a flop. Fagin, here depicted as a dogkeeper, owes him money before Sykes proceeds to kidnap a young wealthy girl, Jenny Foxworth, planning to take a ransom to himself. In a final confrontation, Sykes chases Fagin and the dogs into the subway tunnels in attempt to recapture Jenny until they reach the Brooklyn Bridge. While Roscoe and DeSoto are killed when they fall onto the electrified railway, Sykes fights with Oliver and Dodger on the roof of his limousine, and is brutally killed when his car collides with a train, sending his corpse falling into the East River.

In Disney's 1997 live-action television production, Oliver Twist, Bill Sikes is played by David O'Hara. In the 2005 Oliver Twist Bill Sikes is played by Jamie Foreman. In 2007, Sikes is portrayed by actor Tom Hardy in the BBC One miniseries Oliver Twist, later aired in the United States on PBS' Masterpiece Classic. In the 2015 BBC TV series Dickensian, Sikes is played by Mark Stanley.

In the 2021 movie, Twist, Sikes is altered into a female portrayed by Lena Headey with a pet Doberman named Bull's-eye and appears to be a lesbian when seen in a supposed relationship with Nancy. This version, however, was criticized for transitioning a male character into female.

References

Oliver Twist characters
Fictional murderers
Musical theatre characters
Literary characters introduced in 1838
Male literary villains
Male film villains
Fictional child abusers
Fictional domestic abusers
Fictional English people
Fictional kidnappers
Fictional thieves
Male characters in film
Male characters in literature
Male characters in television